24 Capricorni or A Capricorni is a single star in the southern constellation of Capricornus. This object is visible to the naked eye as a faint, red-hued star with an apparent visual magnitude of +4.49. It is approximately 460 light years from the Sun, based on parallax. The star is moving further from the Earth with a heliocentric radial velocity of +32 km/s.

This is an aging red giant, currently on the asymptotic giant branch, with a stellar classification of M1− III; a star that has exhausted the supply of hydrogen at its core and expanded to 54 times the Sun's radius. It is radiating 611 times the Sun's luminosity from its enlarged photosphere at an effective temperature of 3,903 K.

Chinese name

In R. H. Allen's book, this star is described as having the name Tsoo, representing the state of Chu.  Bayer described it as one of the last three stars of the tail of the goat, although this is not how they appear in modern visual representations of the constellation

References

M-type giants
Asymptotic-giant-branch stars
Capricornus (constellation)
Capricorni, A
Durchmusterung objects
Capricorni, 24
200914
104234
8060